Pendleton Historic District may refer to:

 Pendleton Historic District (Pendleton, Indiana), listed on the NRHP in Indiana
 Pendleton Historic District (Pendleton, South Carolina), listed on the NRHP in South Carolina